Mariani (IPA: ˌmɑːrɪˈænɪ) is a neighbourhood town of Jorhat. It is about 17.5 km from Jorhat Town railway station. Mariani is in the border of Nagaland. Mariani is famous for the Gibbon Wildlife Sanctuary which is located on the roadside on the way to Nakachari from Mariani at a distance of 5 km. Pincode of Mariani is 785634.

This small town is surrounded by some of the largest tea gardens in India. Mariani has a cosmopolitan culture with many communities speaking different languages and living in harmony for decades. The town was once well known for having one of the largest plywood factories in India which was later closed down as felling trees was banned by law.
In Assamese,  is a fisherman and his wife is called .

Geography

Demographics
 India census, Mariani had a population of 23,065. Males constitute 54% of the population and females 46%. In Mariani, 12% of the population is under 6 years of age.

Language

Bengali is the most spoken language at 12,401 speakers, followed by Assamese at 4,344 and Hindi at 3,238.

Transport
Dhodar Ali connects Mariani by road. Mariani is well connected with Jorhat by road. Buses and mini vans (Tata Magic) are available frequently. The nearest airport of Mariani is Jorhat Airport. The town has very good railway connectivity with rest of the country. It is served by Mariani junction, one of the major railhead of Tinsukia railway division. It falls in the Lumding–Dibrugarh section.

Educational institute

Colleges
 Mariani College

Schools
Adarsh Hindi Vidyalaya
Bongshi Gopal High School
Edith Douglas HS School
Railway High School, Mariani
Little Star School
Mahadev Agarwalla Higher Secondary School
Mariani Girls' School
Mariani High School
Mariani Jatiya Vidyapith
Parijat Jatiya Vidyalaya
St. Antony's High School
Asset Academy
Mann International School
Bheleuguri Adarsha High School
Jungle Block High School
218 No Sonowal LP School

Politics
Mariani is part of Jorhat (Lok Sabha constituency).BJP's Rupjyoti Kurmi is the incumbent MLA of Mariani (Vidhan Sabha constituency).
In 2022 Assam municipal elections, The Independent Candidates with Mariani Unnayan Mancha won seven wards out of ten wards, reducing BJP to two in Mariani Municipal Corporation.

Notable personalities
Anamika Choudhari, winner of Sa Re Ga Ma Pa L'il Champs International
 Rupjyoti Kurmi, Indian politician

References

Cities and towns in Jorhat district
Jorhat